"Land of a Thousand Dances" (or "Land of 1000 Dances") is a song written and first recorded by American rhythm and blues singer Chris Kenner in 1962. It later became a bigger hit in versions by Cannibal & the Headhunters and Wilson Pickett. A version by Thee Midniters reached #27 in Canada on March 22, 1965.

The song references a number of dance styles/moves including the Twist, the Alligator, the Mashed Potato, the Watusi and the Pony.

Background
The original Chris Kenner recording, which peaked at No. 77 on the Billboard chart in 1963, mentions 16 dances: the Pony, the Chicken, the Mashed Potato, the Alligator, the Watusi, the Twist, the Fly, the Jerk, the Tango, the Yo-Yo, the Sweet Pea, the Hand Jive, the Slop, the Bop, the Fish, and the Popeye. Kenner's original recording included a brief, gospel-influenced, a capella introduction with the words: "Children, go where I send you / (Where will you send me?) / I'm gon' send you to that land / the land of a thousand dances."  This 18 seconds was left off the single release to facilitate radio airplay, and the phrase "Land of 1000 Dances" never appeared in any subsequent recording.

Cannibal and the Headhunters version
The song is famous for its "na na na na na" hook, which Cannibal & the Headhunters added in their 1965 version, which reached number 30 on the Billboard chart. The hook gave the song further notoriety. The "na na na na na" hook happened by accident when Frankie "Cannibal" Garcia, lead singer of Cannibal and the Headhunters, forgot the lyrics. The melody to this section was also created spontaneously, as it is not in Chris Kenner's original track. The "na na na na na" hook was later borrowed in the 1994 song "Here Comes the Hotstepper" by Jamaican artist Ini Kamoze.

Wilson Pickett version

The song's best-known version was by Wilson Pickett, who recorded the song during his first set of sessions at FAME Studios in Muscle Shoals, Alabama, backed by the Muscle Shoals Rhythm Section and the Memphis Horns. (He had previously recorded in Memphis.) His recording was released as a single and appeared on his album, The Exciting Wilson Pickett. The single became his third Hot R&B/Hip-Hop Songs No. 1 hit and his biggest ever pop hit, peaking at No. 6. In 1988 a re-recorded version by Pickett was featured in a concert during the movie The Great Outdoors, while the original recording is featured at the end credits of the movie. In 1989, the earlier Pickett version was ranked number 152 on Dave Marsh's list of The 1001 Greatest Singles Ever Made.
The version is later used in the 1997 movie The Full Monty.
Pickett's version appears in a 2017 TV commercial for Hulu, the first episode of Season 3 of Sex Education, and a 2022 in American television commercial for the Samsung Galaxy.

Personnel
Vocals: Wilson Pickett
Guitar: Chips Moman, Jimmy Johnson
Keyboards: Spooner Oldham
Drums: Roger Hawkins
Bass: Junior Lowe or Tommy Cogbill
Tenor sax: Charlie Chalmers, Andrew Love
Trumpet: Wayne Jackson
Baritone Sax: Floyd Newman

Other recordings
Some releases of the song credit Antoine "Fats" Domino as a co-author of the song with Kenner. Domino agreed to record the song in exchange for half of the song's royalties.
The J. Geils Band released a live cover version as a single in 1983. Cash Box said that the band "does justice" to the original on the recording. Billboard said that "Acapella chanting, with the audience hooting and clapping in the background, fills out the sound with manic high energy."

Charts 
Chris Kenner version

Cannibal and the Headhunters version

Wilson Pickett version

Ted Nugent version

J. Geils Band version

References

External links 
 
 

1962 singles
1965 singles
1966 singles
1981 singles
Atlantic Records singles
Rhythm and blues songs
Wilson Pickett songs
All-star recordings
Songs written by Chris Kenner
1962 songs
Epic Records singles
Songs about dancing